Supercopa de España is the Spanish water polo's tournament.

It is played as a single match between the League's champion and the Copa del Rey's winner. If a same team wins League and Cup, the Supercopa is played between the League's champion and the Copa's runners-up.

Supercopa was established in 2001 and is usually contested in late September or early October.

Winners by year

Titles by team

See also 
División de Honor
Copa del Rey
Supercopa de España Femenina

References

External links 
Real Federación Española de Natación
competition yearbook

Water polo competitions in Spain